

L' 

 David Ovide L'Espérance b. 1864 first elected in 1911 as Conservative member for Montmagny, Quebec.
 Yvon L'Heureux b. 1914 first elected in 1957 as Liberal member for Chambly—Rouville, Quebec.

La 

 Roch La Salle b. 1929 first elected in 1968 as Progressive Conservative member for Joliette, Quebec.
 Jean-Baptiste Labelle b. 1836 first elected in 1887 as Conservative member for Richelieu, Quebec.
 Simon Labrosse b. 1836 first elected in 1882 as Liberal member for Prescott, Ontario.
 Élie Lacerte b. 1821 first elected in 1868 as Conservative member for Saint Maurice, Quebec.
 Arthur Lachance b. 1868 first elected in 1905 as Liberal member for Quebec-Centre, Quebec.
 Claude-André Lachance b. 1954 first elected in 1974 as Liberal member for Lafontaine, Quebec.
 Georges-C. Lachance b. 1926 first elected in 1962 as Liberal member for Lafontaine, Quebec.
 Sévérin Lachapelle b. 1851 first elected in 1892 as Conservative member for Hochelaga, Quebec.
 Liguori Lacombe b. 1895 first elected in 1925 as Liberal member for Laval—Two Mountains, Quebec.
 Édouard Lacroix b. 1889 first elected in 1925 as Liberal member for Beauce, Quebec.
 Wilfrid Lacroix b. 1891 first elected in 1935 as Liberal member for Québec—Montmorency, Quebec.
 Leon Johnson Ladner b. 1884 first elected in 1921 as Conservative member for Vancouver South, British Columbia.
 Fernand Ladouceur b. 1925 first elected in 1984 as Progressive Conservative member for Labelle, Quebec.
 Leo Kemner Laflamme b. 1893 first elected in 1925 as Liberal member for Montmagny, Quebec.
 Napoléon Kemner Laflamme b. 1865 first elected in 1921 as Liberal member for Drummond—Arthabaska, Quebec.
 Ovide Laflamme b. 1925 first elected in 1955 as Liberal member for Bellechasse, Quebec.
 Rodolphe Laflamme b. 1827 first elected in 1872 as Liberal member for Jacques Cartier, Quebec.
 François-Joseph Laflèche b. 1879 first elected in 1930 as Conservative member for Richmond—Wolfe, Quebec.
 Léo Richer Laflèche b. 1888 first elected in 1942 as Liberal member for Outremont, Quebec.
 Joseph Lafontaine b. 1885 first elected in 1940 as Liberal member for Mégantic—Frontenac, Quebec.
 Jean-Yves Laforest b. 1949 first elected in 2006 as a Bloc Québécois member for Saint-Maurice—Champlain, Quebec.
 David Arthur Lafortune b. 1848 first elected in 1909 as Independent Liberal member for Montcalm, Quebec.
 Mario Laframboise b. 1957 first elected in 2000 as Bloc Québécois member for Argenteuil—Papineau—Mirabel, Quebec.
 Robert B. Lafrenière b. 1924 first elected in 1958 as Progressive Conservative member for Québec—Montmorency, Quebec.
 Paul Lahaye b. 1902 first elected in 1958 as Progressive Conservative member for Champlain, Quebec.
 Arthur Laing b. 1904 first elected in 1949 as Liberal member for Vancouver South, British Columbia.
 David Laird b. 1833 first elected in 1873 as Liberal member for Queen's County, Prince Edward Island.
 Charles Gérin Lajoie b. 1824 first elected in 1874 as Liberal member for Saint Maurice, Quebec.
 Claude G. Lajoie b. 1928 first elected in 1971 as Liberal member for Trois-Rivières, Quebec.
 Mike Lake b. 1969 first elected in 2006 as Conservative member for Edmonton—Mill Woods—Beaumont, Alberta.
 Richard Stuart Lake b. 1860 first elected in 1904 as Conservative member for Qu'Appelle, Northwest Territories.
 Rick Laliberte b. 1958 first elected in 1997 as New Democratic Party member for Churchill River, Saskatchewan.
 Francine Lalonde b. 1940 first elected in 1993 as Bloc Québécois member for Mercier, Quebec.
 Marc Lalonde b. 1929 first elected in 1972 as Liberal member for Outremont, Quebec.
 Marie-France Lalonde b. 1971 first elected in 2019 as Liberal member for Orléans, Ontario. 
 Maurice Lalonde b. 1901 first elected in 1935 as Liberal member for Labelle, Quebec.
 Francis Ramsey Lalor b. 1856 first elected in 1904 as Conservative member for Haldimand, Ontario.
 Paul-Émile Lamarche b. 1881 first elected in 1911 as Conservative member for Nicolet, Quebec.
 Judy LaMarsh b. 1924 first elected in 1960 as Liberal member for Niagara Falls, Ontario.
 Charles Wesley Lamb b. 1891 first elected in 1963 as Progressive Conservative member for Victoria, Ontario.
 Joseph Adrien Henri Lambert b. 1913 first elected in 1968 as Ralliement Créditiste member for Bellechasse, Quebec.
 Marcel Joseph Aimé Lambert b. 1919 first elected in 1957 as Progressive Conservative member for Edmonton West, Alberta.
 Emmanuella Lambropoulos b. 1990 first elected in 2017 as Liberal member for Saint-Laurent, Quebec.
 David Lametti b. 1962 first elected in 2015 as Liberal member for LaSalle—Émard—Verdun, Quebec.
 Kevin Lamoureux b. 1962 first elected in 2020 as Liberal member for Winnipeg North, Manitoba. 
 John Henderson Lamont b. 1865 first elected in 1904 as Liberal member for Provisional District of Saskatchewan, Northwest Territories.
 J. Gilles Lamontagne b. 1919 first elected in 1977 as Liberal member for Langelier, Quebec.
 Maurice Lamontagne b. 1917 first elected in 1963 as Liberal member for Outremont—St-Jean, Quebec.
 Lucien Lamoureux b. 1920 first elected in 1962 as Liberal member for Stormont, Ontario.
 Gérard Lamy b. 1919 first elected in 1962 as Social Credit member for Saint-Maurice—Laflèche, Quebec.
 Edward Arthur Lancaster b. 1860 first elected in 1900 as Conservative member for Lincoln and Niagara, Ontario.
 Adélard Lanctôt b. 1874 first elected in 1907 as Liberal member for Richelieu, Quebec.
 Robert Lanctôt b. 1963 first elected in 2000 as Bloc Québécois member for Châteauguay, Quebec.
 Roch Lanctôt b. 1866 first elected in 1904 as Liberal member for Laprairie—Napierville, Quebec.
 George Landerkin b. 1839 first elected in 1872 as Liberal member for Grey South, Ontario.
 Mike Landers b. 1943 first elected in 1974 as Liberal member for Saint John—Lancaster, New Brunswick.
 John Landeryou b. 1905 first elected in 1935 as Social Credit member for Calgary East, Alberta.
 Auguste Charles Philippe Robert Landry b. 1846 first elected in 1878 as Conservative member for Montmagny, Quebec.
 Jean Landry b. 1948 first elected in 1993 as Bloc Québécois member for Lotbinière, Quebec.
 Joseph-Armand Landry b. 1918 first elected in 1957 as Liberal member for Dorchester, Quebec.
 Monique Landry b. 1937 first elected in 1984 as Progressive Conservative member for Blainville—Deux-Montagnes, Quebec.
 Pierre Amand Landry b. 1846 first elected in 1883 as Conservative member for Kent, New Brunswick.
 Robert Lane first elected in 1979 as Progressive Conservative member for Winnipeg—St. James, Manitoba.
 Samuel Johnathan Lane b. 1830 first elected in 1878 as Liberal-Conservative member for Grey North, Ontario.
 John Lang b. 1839 first elected in 1887 as Independent Liberal member for Peterborough East, Ontario.
 Malcolm Lang b. 1875 first elected in 1926 as Labour Party member for Timiskaming South, Ontario.
 Norman Lang b. 1879 first elected in 1917 as Unionist member for Humboldt, Saskatchewan.
 Otto Lang b. 1932 first elected in 1968 as Liberal member for Saskatoon—Humboldt, Saskatchewan.
 Peter Joseph Lang b. 1950 first elected in 1980 as Liberal member for Kitchener, Ontario.
 Joy Langan b. 1943   first elected in 1988 as New Democratic Party member for Mission—Coquitlam, British Columbia.
 Steven W. Langdon b. 1946 first elected in 1984 as New Democratic Party member for Essex—Windsor, Ontario.
 Charles Langelier b. 1850 first elected in 1887 as Liberal member for Montmorency, Quebec.
 François Charles Stanislas Langelier b. 1838 first elected in 1884 as Liberal member for Mégantic, Quebec.
 Hector-Louis Langevin b. 1826 first elected in 1867 as Conservative member for Dorchester, Quebec.
 Aimé Langlois b. 1880 first elected in 1925 as Liberal member for Chambly—Verchères, Quebec.
 Charles A. Langlois b. 1938 first elected in 1988 as Progressive Conservative member for Manicouagan, Quebec.
 François Langlois b. 1948 first elected in 1993 as Bloc Québécois member for Bellechasse, Quebec.
 J. G. Léopold Langlois b. 1913 first elected in 1945 as Liberal member for Gaspé, Quebec.
 Jean Langlois b. 1824 first elected in 1867 as Conservative member for Montmorency, Quebec.
 Joseph Langlois b. 1909 first elected in 1949 as Liberal member for Berthier—Maskinongé, Quebec.
 Paul Langlois b. 1926 first elected in 1965 as Liberal member for Chicoutimi, Quebec.
 Raymond Langlois b. 1936 first elected in 1962 as Social Credit member for Mégantic, Quebec.
 William Fitzgerald Langworthy b. 1867 first elected in 1925 as Conservative member for Port Arthur—Thunder Bay, Ontario.
 Gérald Laniel b. 1924   first elected in 1962 as Liberal member for Beauharnois—Salaberry, Quebec.
 Claude Lanthier b. 1933   first elected in 1984 as Progressive Conservative member for Lasalle, Quebec.
 Jacques Philippe Lantier b. 1814 first elected in 1872 as Conservative member for Soulanges, Quebec.
 Melissa Lantsman b. 1984 first elected in 2021 as Conservative member for Thornhill, Ontario.
 Georges-Émile Lapalme b. 1907   first elected in 1945 as Liberal member for Joliette—l'Assomption—Montcalm, Quebec.
 Edmond Lapierre b. 1866 first elected in 1921 as Liberal member for Nipissing, Ontario.
 Jean Lapierre b. 1956 first elected in 1979 as Liberal member for Shefford, Quebec.
 Réal Lapierre b. 1944 first elected in 2004 as Bloc Québécois member for Lévis—Bellechasse, Quebec.
 Arthur-Joseph Lapointe b. 1895 first elected in 1935 as Liberal member for Matapédia—Matane, Quebec.
 Charles Lapointe b. 1944   first elected in 1974 as Liberal member for Charlevoix, Quebec.
 Ernest Lapointe b. 1876   first elected in 1904 as Liberal member for Kamouraska, Quebec.
 François Lapointe b. 1971 first elected in 2011 as New Democratic Party member for Montmagny—L'Islet—Kamouraska—Rivière-du-Loup, Quebec. 
 Hugues Lapointe b. 1911   first elected in 1940 as Liberal member for Lotbinière, Quebec.
 Linda Lapointe b. 1960 first elected in 2015 as Liberal member for Rivière-des-Mille-Îles, Quebec.
 Louis Audet Lapointe b. 1860 first elected in 1911 as Liberal member for St. James, Quebec.
 Normand Lapointe b. 1939   first elected in 1980 as Liberal member for Beauce, Quebec.
 Viviane Lapointe first elected in 2021 as Liberal member for Sudbury, Ontario. 
 Rodney Edward Laporte b. 1953   first elected in 1988 as New Democratic Party member for Moose Jaw—Lake Centre, Saskatchewan.
 Gérard Laprise b. 1925 first elected in 1962 as Social Credit member for Chapleau, Quebec.
 James Lapum b. 1819 first elected in 1867 as Conservative member for Addington, Ontario.
 J. James Larabee b. 1885 first elected in 1935 as Liberal member for Queen's, Prince Edward Island.
 Alphonse Alfred Clément Larivière b. 1842 first elected in 1889 as Conservative member for Provencher, Manitoba.
 Jean-François Larose b. 1972 first elected in 2011 as New Democratic Party member for Repentigny, Quebec.
 Andréanne Larouche first elected in 2019 as Bloc Québécois member for Shefford, Quebec. 
 Gaby Larrivée b. 1933 first elected in 1988 as Progressive Conservative member for Joliette, Quebec.
 Frederick Hugo Larson b. 1913 first elected in 1949 as Liberal member for Kindersley, Saskatchewan.
 Achille Larue b. 1849 first elected in 1878 as Liberal member for Bellechasse, Quebec.
 Joseph-Ernest-Henri Larue b. 1892 first elected in 1930 as Conservative member for Matane, Quebec.
 Perrault LaRue b. 1925 first elected in 1958 as Progressive Conservative member for Saguenay, Quebec.
 Walt Lastewka b. 1940 first elected in 1993 as Liberal member for St. Catharines, Ontario.
 Alexandrine Latendresse b. 1984 first elected in 2011 as New Democratic Party member for Louis-Saint-Laurent, Quebec. 
 Joseph-Octave Latour b. 1906 first elected in 1958 as Progressive Conservative member for Argenteuil—Deux-Montagnes, Quebec.
 Patricia Lattanzio first elected in 2019 as Liberal member for Saint-Léonard—Saint-Michel, Quebec.
 Henry P. Latulippe b. 1913 first elected in 1962 as Social Credit member for Compton—Frontenac, Quebec.
 Frederick Andrew Laurence b. 1843 first elected in 1904 as Liberal member for Colchester, Nova Scotia.
 Aldéric Laurendeau b. 1890 first elected in 1945 as Liberal member for Berthier—Maskinongé, Quebec.
 John Wimburne Laurie b. 1835 first elected in 1887 as Conservative member for Shelburne, Nova Scotia.
 Romuald-Charlemagne Laurier b. 1852 first elected in 1900 as Liberal member for L'Assomption, Quebec.
 Ruben Charles Laurier b. 1868 first elected in 1907 as Liberal member for L'Assomption, Quebec.
 Wilfrid Laurier b. 1841 first elected in 1874 as Liberal member for Drummond—Arthabaska, Quebec.
 Joseph-Georges-Philippe Laurin b. 1892   first elected in 1930 as Conservative member for Jacques Cartier, Quebec.
 René Laurin b. 1940 first elected in 1993 as Bloc Québécois member for Joliette, Quebec.
 Guy Lauzon b. 1944 first elected in 2004 as Conservative member for Stormont—Dundas—South Glengarry, Ontario.
 Stéphane Lauzon b. 1966 first elected in 2015 as Liberal member for Argenteuil—La Petite-Nation, Quebec.
 Carole Lavallée b. 1954 first elected in 2004 as Bloc Québécois member for Saint-Bruno—Saint-Hubert, Quebec.
 Joseph Octave Lavallée b. 1878 first elected in 1911 as Conservative member for Bellechasse, Quebec.
 John Reeve Lavell b. 1857 first elected in 1900 as Conservative member for Leeds North and Grenville North, Ontario.
 Hélène Laverdière b. 1955 first elected in 2011 as New Democratic Party member for Laurier—Sainte-Marie, Quebec. 
 Herman E. Laverdière b. 1927   first elected in 1963 as Liberal member for Bellechasse, Quebec.
 Armand Renaud Lavergne b. 1880   first elected in 1904 as Liberal member for Montmagny, Quebec.
 Joseph Lavergne b. 1847 first elected in 1887 as Liberal member for Drummond—Arthabaska, Quebec.
 Louis Lavergne b. 1845 first elected in 1897 as Liberal member for Drummond—Arthabaska, Quebec.
 Albert Peter Lavigne b. 1908 first elected in 1954 as Liberal member for Stormont, Ontario.
 Laurent Lavigne b. 1935 first elected in 1993 as Bloc Québécois member for Beauharnois—Salaberry, Quebec.
 Raymond Lavigne b. 1945 first elected in 1993 as Liberal member for Verdun—Saint-Paul, Quebec.
 Henri-Edgar Lavigueur b. 1867 first elected in 1917 as Laurier Liberal member for Quebec County, Quebec.
 Jacques Lavoie b. 1936 first elected in 1975 as Progressive Conservative member for Hochelaga, Quebec.
 Bowman Brown Law b. 1855 first elected in 1902 as Liberal member for Yarmouth, Nova Scotia.
 Allan Frederick Lawrence b. 1925 first elected in 1972 as Progressive Conservative member for Northumberland—Durham, Ontario.
 Philip Lawrence first elected in 2019 as Conservative member for Northumberland—Peterborough South, Ontario. 
 James Earl Lawson b. 1891 first elected in 1928 as Conservative member for York West, Ontario.
 Peter Lawson b. 1821 first elected in 1867 as Liberal member for Norfolk South, Ontario.
 Jack Layton b. 1950 first elected in 2004 as New Democratic Party member for Toronto—Danforth, Ontario.
 Robert E.J. Layton b. 1925 first elected in 1984 as Progressive Conservative member for Lachine, Quebec.

Le 

 Isaac Le Vesconte b. 1822 first elected in 1869 as Conservative member for Richmond, Nova Scotia.
 Harry Leader b. 1880 first elected in 1921 as Progressive member for Portage la Prairie, Manitoba.
 Denis Lebel b. 1954 first elected in 2007 as Conservative member for Roberval—Lac-Saint-Jean, Quebec. 
 Ghislain Lebel b. 1946 first elected in 1993 as Bloc Québécois member for Chambly, Quebec.
 Dominic LeBlanc b. 1967 first elected in 2000 as Liberal member for Beauséjour—Petitcodiac, New Brunswick.
 Fernand-E. Leblanc b. 1917 first elected in 1964 as Liberal member for Laurier, Quebec.
 Francis G. Leblanc b. 1953 first elected in 1988 as Liberal member for Cape Breton Highlands—Canso, Nova Scotia.
 Hélène LeBlanc b. 1958 first elected in 2011 as New Democratic Party member for LaSalle—Émard, Quebec.
 Louis Guy Leblanc b. 1921 first elected in 1965 as Liberal member for Rimouski, Quebec.
 Nic Leblanc b. 1941 first elected in 1984 as Progressive Conservative member for Longueuil, Quebec.
 Olivier J. Leblanc b. 1830 first elected in 1900 as Liberal member for Kent, New Brunswick.
 Roméo LeBlanc b. 1927 first elected in 1972 as Liberal member for Westmorland—Kent, New Brunswick.
 Bert Leboe b. 1909 first elected in 1953 as Social Credit member for Cariboo, British Columbia.
 Diane Lebouthillier b. 1959 first elected in 2015 as Liberal member for Gaspésie—Les Îles-de-la-Madeleine, Quebec.
 Pierre-Julien Leclair b. 1860 first elected in 1893 as Conservative member for Terrebonne, Quebec.
 Joseph-Hermas Leclerc b. 1877 first elected in 1935 as Liberal member for Shefford, Quebec.
 Edgar Leduc b. 1888   first elected in 1949 as Independent member for Jacques Cartier, Quebec.
 Jean-Louis Leduc b. 1918 first elected in 1979 as Liberal member for Richelieu, Quebec.
 Joseph Alfred Leduc b. 1868 first elected in 1917 as Laurier Liberal member for Westmount—St. Henri, Quebec.
 Joseph Gérard Yves Leduc b. 1908   first elected in 1954 as Liberal member for Verdun, Quebec.
 Joseph Hector Leduc b. 1864 first elected in 1891 as Liberal member for Nicolet, Quebec.
 Rodolphe Leduc b. 1902 first elected in 1936 as Liberal member for Wright, Quebec.
 Arthur John Lee b. 1947 first elected in 1974 as Liberal member for Vancouver East, British Columbia.
 Derek Lee b. 1948 first elected in 1988 as Liberal member for Scarborough—Rouge River, Ontario.
 Ryan Leef b. 1973 first elected in 2011 as Conservative member for Yukon. 
 Paul Lefebvre b. 1974 first elected in 2015 as Liberal member for Sudbury, Ontario.
 Réjean Lefebvre b. 1943 first elected in 1993 as Bloc Québécois member for Champlain, Quebec.
 Thomas Lefebvre b. 1927 first elected in 1965 as Liberal member for Pontiac—Témiscamingue, Quebec.
 J.-Eugène Lefrançois b. 1896 first elected in 1949 as Liberal member for Laurier, Quebec.
 Alfred Alexander Lefurgey b. 1871 first elected in 1900 as Conservative member for East Prince, Prince Edward Island.
 Gérard Légaré b. 1908 first elected in 1953 as Liberal member for Rimouski, Quebec.
 Carl Legault b. 1923 first elected in 1964 as Liberal member for Nipissing, Ontario.
 Auguste Théophile Léger b. 1852 first elected in 1917 as Laurier Liberal member for Kent, New Brunswick.
 Aurel D. Léger b. 1894 first elected in 1940 as Liberal member for Kent, New Brunswick.
 Édouard H. Léger b. 1866 first elected in 1890 as Conservative member for Kent, New Brunswick.
 Felton Fenwick Legere b. 1913 first elected in 1958 as Progressive Conservative member for Shelburne—Yarmouth—Clare, Nova Scotia.
 Stuart Malcolm Leggatt b. 1931 first elected in 1972 as New Democratic Party member for New Westminster, British Columbia.
 Joseph Hormidas Legris b. 1850 first elected in 1891 as Liberal member for Maskinongé, Quebec.
 Richard Lehoux b. 1956 first elected in 2019 as Conservative member for Beauce. 
 Kellie Leitch b. 1970 first elected in 2011 as Conservative member for Simcoe—Grey, Ontario.
 Marc Lemay b. 1951 first elected in 2004 as Bloc Québécois member for Abitibi—Témiscamingue, Quebec.
 Denis Lemieux b. 1964 first elected in 2015 as Liberal member for Chicoutimi—Le Fjord, Quebec.
 Pierre Lemieux b. 1963 first elected in 2006 as Conservative member for Glengarry—Prescott—Russell, Ontario. 
 Rodolphe Lemieux b. 1866 first elected in 1896 as Liberal member for Gaspé, Quebec.
 Sébastien Lemire first elected in 2019 as Bloc Québécois member for Abitibi—Témiscamingue, Quebec.
 Frank Exton Lennard b. 1892 first elected in 1935 as Conservative member for Wentworth, Ontario.
 Haughton Lennox b. 1850 first elected in 1900 as Conservative member for Simcoe South, Ontario.
 Thomas Herbert Lennox b. 1869 first elected in 1925 as Conservative member for York North, Ontario.
 Joseph-Édouard-Émile Léonard b. 1872 first elected in 1902 as Conservative member for Laval, Quebec.
 Alphonse Télesphore Lépine b. 1855 first elected in 1888 as Independent Conservative member for Montreal East, Quebec.
 Gaston Leroux b. 1948 first elected in 1993 as Bloc Québécois member for Richmond—Wolfe, Quebec.
 Jean H. Leroux b. 1949 first elected in 1993 as Bloc Québécois member for Shefford, Quebec.
 Charles Alexander Lesage b. 1843 first elected in 1882 as Conservative member for Dorchester, Quebec.
 Jean Lesage b. 1912 first elected in 1945 as Liberal member for Montmagny—l'Islet, Quebec.
 Joseph Edmond Lesage b. 1871 first elected in 1917 as Laurier Liberal member for Hochelaga, Quebec.
 William Lesick b. 1923 first elected in 1984 as Progressive Conservative member for Edmonton East, Alberta.
 Andrew Leslie b. 1957 first elected in 2015 as Liberal member for Orléans, Ontario.
 Megan Leslie b. 1973 first elected in 2008 as New Democratic member for Halifax, Nova Scotia.
 H.-Pit Lessard b. 1913 first elected in 1958 as Liberal member for Saint-Henri, Quebec.
 Marcel Lessard b. 1926 first elected in 1962 as Social Credit member for Lac-Saint-Jean, Quebec.
 Yves Lessard b. 1943 first elected in 2004 as Bloc Québécois member for Chambly—Borduas, Quebec.
 Richard Vryling Lesueur b. 1879 first elected in 1921 as Conservative member for Lambton West, Ontario.
 Joseph Étienne Letellier de Saint-Just b. 1880 first elected in 1925 as Liberal member for Compton, Quebec.
 René Joseph Eugène Létourneau b. 1912 first elected in 1958 as Progressive Conservative member for Stanstead, Quebec.
 Chungsen Leung b. 1950 first elected in 2011 as Conservative member for Willowdale, Ontario. 
 Sophia Leung b. 1933 first elected in 1997 as Liberal member for Vancouver Kingsway, British Columbia.
 Yvon Lévesque b. 1940 first elected in 2004 as Bloc Québécois member for Nunavik—Eeyou, Quebec.
 Michael Levitt b. 1970 first elected in 2015 as Liberal member for York Centre, Ontario. 
 Arthur John Lewis b. 1879 first elected in 1921 as Progressive member for Swift Current, Saskatchewan.
 Chris Lewis first elected in 2019 as Conservative member for Essex.
 David Lewis b. 1909 first elected in 1962 as New Democratic Party member for York South, Ontario.
 Doug Lewis b. 1938 first elected in 1979 as Progressive Conservative member for Simcoe North, Ontario.
 Edward Norman Lewis b. 1858 first elected in 1904 as Conservative member for Huron West, Ontario.
 John Bower Lewis b. 1815 first elected in 1872 as Conservative member for City of Ottawa, Ontario.
 Leslyn Lewis b. 1970 first elected in 2021 as Conservative member for Haldimand—Norfolk, Ontario. 
 William James Lewis b. 1830 first elected in 1896 as Independent member for Albert, New Brunswick.
 Louis Harrington Lewry b. 1919 first elected in 1957 as Cooperative Commonwealth Federation member for Moose Jaw—Lake Centre, Saskatchewan.
 Laverne Lewycky b. 1946 first elected in 1980 as New Democratic Party member for Dauphin, Manitoba.

Li 
 Ron Liepert b. 1949 first elected in 2015 as Conservative member for Calgary Signal Hill, Alberta. 
 Joël Lightbound b. 1988 first elected in 2015 as Liberal member for Louis-Hébert, Quebec.
 Wendy Lill b. 1950   first elected in 1997 as New Democratic Party member for Dartmouth, Nova Scotia.
 Rick Limoges b. 1956   first elected in 1999 as Liberal member for Windsor—St. Clair, Ontario.
 Clifford Lincoln b. 1928   first elected in 1993 as Liberal member for Lachine—Lac-Saint-Louis, Quebec.
 James Lind b. 1913   first elected in 1965 as Liberal member for Middlesex East, Ontario.
 Urbain Lippé b. 1831 first elected in 1891 as Conservative member for Joliette, Quebec.
 James Frederick Lister b. 1843 first elected in 1882 as Liberal member for Lambton West, Ontario.
 Walter Little b. 1877   first elected in 1935 as Liberal member for Timiskaming, Ontario.
 William Carruthers Little b. 1820 first elected in 1867 as Liberal-Conservative member for Simcoe South, Ontario.
 Willie Littlechild b. 1944   first elected in 1988 as Progressive Conservative member for Wetaskiwin, Alberta.
 Laurin Liu b. 1990 first elected in 2011 as New Democratic Party member for Rivière-des-Mille-Îles, Quebec.
 James Livingston b. 1838 first elected in 1882 as Liberal member for Waterloo South, Ontario.
 Wladyslaw Lizon b. 1954 first elected in 2011 as Conservative member for Mississauga East—Cooksville, Ontario. 
 Louis Philippe Lizotte b. 1891 first elected in 1940 as Liberal member for Kamouraska, Quebec.

Ll 
 Dane Lloyd b. 1990 first elected in 2017 as Conservative member for Sturgeon River—Parkland, Alberta.
 John Edward Lloyd b. 1908 first elected in 1963 as Liberal member for Halifax, Nova Scotia.

Lo 
 Ben Lobb b. 1976 first elected in 2008 as Conservative member for Huron—Bruce, Ontario.
 Alaina Lockhart b. 1974 first elected in 2015 as Liberal member for Fundy Royal, New Brunswick. 
 Norman James Macdonald Lockhart b. 1884 first elected in 1935 as Conservative member for Lincoln, Ontario.
 Edward Russell Lockyer b. 1899 first elected in 1958 as Progressive Conservative member for Trinity, Ontario.
 Hance James Logan b. 1869 first elected in 1896 as Liberal member for Cumberland, Nova Scotia.
 William Stewart Loggie b. 1850 first elected in 1904 as Liberal member for Northumberland, New Brunswick.
 Bernard Loiselle b. 1948   first elected in 1974 as Liberal member for Chambly, Quebec.
 Gérard Loiselle b. 1921   first elected in 1957 as Independent Liberal member for St. Ann, Quebec.
 Gilles Loiselle b. 1929   first elected in 1988 as Progressive Conservative member for Langelier, Quebec.
 Edison John Clayton Loney b. 1929   first elected in 1963 as Progressive Conservative member for Bruce, Ontario.
 Charles Edwin Long b. 1879   first elected in 1917 as Liberal member for North Battleford, Saskatchewan.
 Wayne Long b. 1963 first elected in 2015 as Liberal member for Saint John—Rothesay, New Brunswick.
 Judi Longfield b. 1947   first elected in 1997 as Liberal member for Whitby—Ajax, Ontario.
 Lloyd Longfield b. 1956 first elected in 2015 as Liberal member for Guelph, Ontario. 
 Avard Longley b. 1823 first elected in 1878 as Conservative member for Annapolis, Nova Scotia.
 Bruce Lonsdale b. 1949   first elected in 1980 as Liberal member for Timiskaming, Ontario.
 Ricardo Lopez b. 1937   first elected in 1984 as Progressive Conservative member for Châteauguay, Quebec.
 Joseph Arthur Lortie b. 1869 first elected in 1908 as Conservative member for Soulanges, Quebec.
 Yvan Loubier b. 1959   first elected in 1993 as Bloc Québécois member for Saint-Hyacinthe—Bagot, Quebec.
 William John Loucks b. 1873 first elected in 1930 as Liberal member for Rosetown, Saskatchewan.
 Tim Louis b. 1969 first elected in 2019 as Liberal member for Kitchener—Conestoga, Ontario.
 William Lount b. 1840 first elected in 1896 as Liberal member for Toronto Centre, Ontario.
 Charles Henry Lovell b. 1854 first elected in 1908 as Liberal member for Stanstead, Quebec.
 Henry Lovell b. 1828 first elected in 1900 as Liberal member for Stanstead, Quebec.
 Lewis Johnstone Lovett b. 1867 first elected in 1921 as Liberal member for Digby and Annapolis, Nova Scotia.
 William James Lovie b. 1868 first elected in 1921 as Progressive member for Macdonald, Manitoba.
 John Lovitt b. 1832 first elected in 1887 as Liberal member for Yarmouth, Nova Scotia.
 Solon Earl Low b. 1900   first elected in 1945 as Social Credit member for Peace River, Alberta.
 Thomas Andrew Low b. 1871 first elected in 1908 as Liberal member for Renfrew South, Ontario.
 James A. Lowell b. 1849 first elected in 1892 as Liberal member for Welland, Ontario.
 Eric Lowther b. 1954 first elected in 1997 as Reform member for Calgary Centre, Alberta.
 George di Madeiros Loy b. 1840 first elected in 1900 as Liberal member for Beauharnois, Quebec.

Lu 

 William Thomas Lucas b. 1875 first elected in 1921 as United Farmers of Alberta member for Victoria, Alberta.
 Michael Luchkovich b. 1892 first elected in 1926 as United Farmers of Alberta member for Vegreville, Alberta.
 Karen Ludwig b. 1964 first elected in 2015 as Liberal member for New Brunswick Southwest, New Brunswick.
 Tom Lukiwski b. 1951 first elected in 2004 as Conservative member for Regina—Lumsden—Lake Centre, Saskatchewan.
 Edward C. Lumley b. 1939 first elected in 1974 as Liberal member for Stormont—Dundas, Ontario.
 John Lundrigan b. 1939 first elected in 1968 as Progressive Conservative member for Gander—Twillingate, Newfoundland and Labrador.
 Gary Lunn b. 1957 first elected in 1997 as Reform member for Saanich—Gulf Islands, British Columbia.
 James D. Lunney b. 1951 first elected in 2000 as Canadian Alliance member for Nanaimo—Alberni, British Columbia.
 Azel Randolph Lusby b. 1907 first elected in 1953 as Liberal member for Cumberland, Nova Scotia.
 Marcel Lussier b. 1944 first elected in 2006 as Bloc Québécois member for Brossard—La Prairie, Quebec.

Ly
 James S. Lynch b. 1841 first elected in 1871 as Liberal member for Marquette, Manitoba.

L